Bentley is a village and civil parish in the North Warwickshire district of Warwickshire, England, about two miles south-west of Atherstone.  According to the 2001 Census it had a population of 101. From the 2011 Census the population of Bentley has been included in Merevale.

References

Villages in Warwickshire